Gülcemal is a Turkish name meaning "rose faced", and may refer to:

 Gülcemal Kadın (c. 1826–1851), a wife of Ottoman Sultan Abdülmecid I
 Gul Djemal (Ottoman ship), Ottoman passenger ship, ex SS Germanic (1874)
 Gülcemal (Turkish ship), Turkish passenger ship, ex Gul Djemal (Ottoman ship)

Turkish given names